Araxos is a village and a community in the municipal unit of Larissos  of the municipality West Achaea in the northwestern part of Achaea, Greece. The community consists of the villages Araxos, Akrotirio Araxos and Taxiarches. It is located in the coastal plains near Cape Araxos, which separates  the Gulf of Patras from the Ionian Sea. There are two lagoons near the village Araxos: Prokopos to the southwest and Kalogria (or Pappas or Araxos) to the north. The Mavra Vouna hills are in the north, Cape Araxos being their northernmost point. It is 4 km west of Lakkopetra, 1 km west of Araxos Airport, 5 km north of Metochi and 13 km west of Kato Achaia.

Strofilia wetlands natural park
Near the village of Araxos we find the Strofilia natural park and the famous Kalogria beach. Strofilia  is a national park of 22 km² which is part of the Natura 2000 network and is protected under the Ramsar Convention. The wetlands ecosystem occupies a coastal zone of about 22 km in length and with an average width of 1500 m. It is a compound coastal ecosystem, that includes the lagoons of Prokopos and Kalogria (or Pappas)  the Lamia marshes, as well as the forest of Strofilia (Natura 2000 codes: GR 232001 and GR233006). The Stone pine (Pinus pinea) forest of Strofylia, is the most extensive Stone pine forest in all of Greece and one of the largest in Europe. Most of the area lies in sand-dune formations.

Historical population

Araxos Air Base

An auxiliary military airfield was constructed in the area in 1939. Construction of the base began around 1958 and it became operational in 1962. Currently the base is used by 116 Combat Wing of the Hellenic Air Force which consists of 335 Bombing Squadron and 336 Bombing Squadron, both equipped with F-16C/D Block 52+ aircraft. The runway length is 3352 m running in a south to north direction (18/36). The military installations are accessed from Lakkopetra to the north.

From 1978 to 2001 Araxos Air Base was also home of the NATO 345 Air Munitions Company. This unit was responsible for U.S. B61 nuclear bombs intended for delivery by Hellenic Air Force A-7H aircraft under NATO nuclear sharing arrangements. The nuclear weapons were stored in vaults inside the base's Hardened Aircraft Shelters using the WS3 Weapon Storage and Security System.

Araxos Airport
Araxos Airport (IATA: GPA, ICAO: LGRX) is a civilian airport that uses the military base runway. Araxos is the closest airport to the city of Patras. During summer time the airport serves a few civilian charter flights from northern Europe. The civil aviation installations are accessed from the south.

Gallery

See also
Dymaean Wall
List of settlements in Achaea

References

External links

 Araxos Airport in Greek Airport Guide

Military installations of Greece
Populated places in Achaea